Mictopsichia atoyaca is a species of moth of the family Tortricidae. It is found in Mexico.

The wingspan is about 14 mm. The ground colour of the forewings is pale orange at the costa, the dorso-median area is creamish reticulate (net like) brown and the basal and subapical streaks are yellow orange. The hindwings are pale orange with brownish apical and subapical fascia.

Etymology
The name refers to the type locality of the species, Atoyac, Veracruz, Mexico.

References

Moths described in 2009
Mictopsichia
Moths of Central America
Taxa named by Józef Razowski